Giancarlo Peris (born  4 November 1941), an Italian track athlete of Greek descent, was the final bearer of the Olympic torch for the 1960 Summer Olympics in Rome, Italy.

Biography
Peris was born in Civitavecchia, a port city on the Tyrrhenian Sea 70 kilometers northwest of Rome. The Italian National Olympic Committee decided that the last torchbearer of the Olympic Games would be the winner of a junior Cross country running race. Peris won and was chosen to be the last torchbearer. Peris was also a promising track athlete and few months before the opening of the Olympic games he competed for his country's national junior/youth team against Poland.

He later became a teacher of history and Italian at the technical high-school "G. Baccelli" of Civitavecchia. He also coached at a small athletics club.

See also
 1960 Summer Olympics

References

External links 

  

1941 births
Living people
People from Civitavecchia
Olympic cauldron lighters
Italian male middle-distance runners
Italian people of Greek descent
Sportspeople from the Metropolitan City of Rome Capital